The 1992 United States House of Representatives elections were held on November 3, 1992, to elect U.S. Representatives to serve in the 103rd United States Congress. They coincided with the 1992 presidential election, in which Democrat Bill Clinton was elected as President, defeating Republican incumbent President George H. W. Bush.

Despite this, however, the Democrats lost a net of nine seats in the House to the Republicans, in part due to redistricting following the 1990 Census. This election was the first to use districts drawn up during the 1990 United States redistricting cycle on the basis of the 1990 Census. The redrawn districts were notable for the increase in majority-minority districts, drawn as mandated by the Voting Rights Act. The 1980 Census resulted in 17 majority-black districts and 10 majority-Hispanic districts, but 32 and 19 such districts, respectively, were drawn after 1990.

This was the first time ever that the victorious presidential party lost seats in the House in two consecutive elections. , this is the last congressional election in which Republicans won a House seat in Rhode Island, and the last time the Democrats won the House for more than two consecutive elections.

Overall results

Source: Election Statistics - Office of the Clerk

Retiring incumbents
65 members did not seek re-election: 41 Democrats and 24 Republicans.

Democrats 
 : Claude Harris Jr.
 : Barbara Boxer
 : Edward R. Roybal
 : Mel Levine
 : Mervyn Dymally
 : Glenn M. Anderson
 : Ben Nighthorse Campbell
 :Tom Carper
 : Charles E. Bennett
 : Lawrence J. Smith
 : William Lehman
 : Dante Fascell
 : Robert Lindsay Thomas
 : Ed Jenkins
 : Doug Barnard Jr.
 : Richard H. Stallings
 : Frank Annunzio
 : Chris Perkins
 : Brian J. Donnelly
 : J. Bob Traxler
 : Howard Wolpe
 : Dennis Hertel
 : Bernard J. Dwyer
 : Robert A. Roe
 : Frank Joseph Guarini
 : Robert J. Mrazek
 : James H. Scheuer
 : Matthew F. McHugh
 : Henry J. Nowak
 : Byron Dorgan
 : Charlie Luken
 : Dennis E. Eckart
 : Donald J. Pease
 : Ed Feighan
 : Les AuCoin
 : Gus Yatron
 : Joseph M. Gaydos
 : Robin Tallon
 : Wayne Owens
 : Jim Olin
 : Jim Moody

Republicans 
 : William Louis Dickinson
 : John Paul Hammerschmidt
 : Tom Campbell
 : William E. Dannemeyer
 : Bill Lowery
 : Craig T. James
 : Andy Ireland
 : Larry J. Hopkins
 : Robert William Davis
 : Carl Pursell
 : William Broomfield
 : Vin Weber
 : Matthew John Rinaldo
 : Norman F. Lent
 : Raymond J. McGrath
 : David O'Brien Martin
 : Frank Horton
 : Chalmers Wylie
 : Richard T. Schulze
 : Lawrence Coughlin
 : George Allen
 : John R. Miller
 : Sid Morrison
 : Rod Chandler

Incumbents defeated

Democrats 
. Ben Erdreich
. William Vollie Alexander Jr.
. Beryl Anthony Jr.
. Charles Floyd Hatcher
. Ben Jones
. Charles Hayes
. Gus Savage
. Marty Russo
. John W. Cox Jr.
. Terry L. Bruce
. Jim Jontz
. David R. Nagle
. Carroll Hubbard
. Jerry Huckaby
. Tom McMillen
. Beverly Byron
. Joseph D. Early
. Chester G. Atkins
. Nicholas Mavroules
. Gerry Sikorski

Republicans 
. John Jacob Rhodes III
. Frank Riggs
. Robert J. Lagomarsino
. Clyde C. Holloway
. Dick Nichols

Special elections 

|-
! 
| Jaime Fuster
|  | Popular Democratic
| 1984
|  | Incumbent resigned March 4, 1992 to become Justice of the Supreme Court of Puerto Rico.New member elected March 4, 1992Popular Democratic hold.
| nowrap | 

|-
! 
| Theodore S. Weiss
|  | Democratic
| 1976
|  | Incumbent died September 14, 1992.New member elected November 3, 1992.Democratic hold.
| nowrap | 

|-
! 
| Walter B. Jones Sr.
|  | Democratic
| 1966 
|  | Incumbent died September 15, 1992.New member elected November 3, 1992.Democratic hold.
| nowrap | 

|}

Alabama 

|-
! 
| Sonny Callahan
|  | Republican
| 1984
| Incumbent re-elected.
| nowrap | 

|-
! 
| William Louis Dickinson
|  | Republican
| 1964
|  | Incumbent retired.New member elected.Republican hold.
| nowrap | 

|-
! 
| Glen Browder
|  | Democratic
| 1989 
| Incumbent re-elected.
| nowrap | 

|-
! 
| Tom Bevill
|  | Democratic
| 1966
| Incumbent re-elected.
| nowrap | 

|-
! 
| Robert E. Cramer
|  | Democratic
| 1990
| Incumbent re-elected.
| nowrap | 

|-
! 
| Ben Erdreich
|  | Democratic
| 1982
|  | Incumbent lost re-election.New member elected.Republican gain.
| nowrap | 

|-
! 
| Claude Harris Jr.
|  | Democratic
| 1986
|  | Incumbent retired.New member elected.Democratic hold.
| nowrap | 

|}

Alaska 

|-
! 
| Don Young
|  | Republican
| 1973 
| Incumbent re-elected.
| nowrap | 

|}

Arizona 

|-
! 
| John Jacob Rhodes III
|  | Republican
| 1986
|  | Incumbent lost re-election.New member elected.Democratic gain.
| nowrap | 

|-
! 
| Ed Pastor
|  | Democratic
| 1991 
| Incumbent re-elected.
| nowrap | 

|-
! 
| Bob Stump
|  | Republican
| 1976
| Incumbent re-elected.
| nowrap | 

|-
! 
| Jon Kyl
|  | Republican
| 1986
| Incumbent re-elected.
| nowrap | 

|-
! 
| Jim Kolbe
|  | Republican
| 1984
| Incumbent re-elected.
| nowrap | 

|-
! 
| colspan=3 | None (District created)
|  | New seat.New member elected.Democratic gain.
| nowrap | 

|}

Arkansas 

|-
! 
| William Vollie Alexander Jr.
|  | Democratic
| 1968
|  | Incumbent lost renomination.New member elected.Democratic hold.
| nowrap | 

|-
! 
| Ray Thornton
|  | Democratic
| 19721978 1990
| Incumbent re-elected.
| nowrap | 

|-
! 
| John Paul Hammerschmidt
|  | Republican
| 1966
|  | Incumbent retired.New member elected.Republican hold.
| nowrap | 

|-
! 
| Beryl Anthony Jr.
|  | Democratic
| 1978
|  | Incumbent lost renomination.New member elected.Republican gain.
| nowrap | 

|}

California 

The delegation increased from 45 to 52 seats.

|-
! 
| Frank Riggs
|  | Republican
| 1990
|  | Incumbent lost re-election.New member elected.Democratic gain.
| nowrap | 

|-
! 
| Wally Herger
|  | Republican
| 1986
| Incumbent re-elected.
| nowrap | 

|-
! 
| Vic Fazio
|  | Democratic
| 1978
| Incumbent re-elected.
| nowrap | 

|-
! 
| John Doolittle
|  | Republican
| 1990
| Incumbent re-elected.
| nowrap | 

|-
! 
| Bob Matsui
|  | Democratic
| 1978
| Incumbent re-elected.
| nowrap | 

|-
! 
| Barbara Boxer
|  | Democratic
| 1982
|  | Retired to run for U.S. senator.New member elected.Democratic hold.
| nowrap | 

|-
! 
| George Miller
|  | Democratic
| 1974
| Incumbent re-elected.
| nowrap | 

|-
! 
| Nancy Pelosi
|  | Democratic
| 1987 
| Incumbent re-elected.
| nowrap | 

|-
! 
| Ron Dellums
|  | Democratic
| 1970
| Incumbent re-elected.
| nowrap | 

|-
! 
| colspan=3 | None (District created)
|  | New seat.New member elected.Republican gain.
| nowrap | 

|-
! 
| colspan=3 | None (District created)
|  | New seat.New member elected.Republican gain.
| nowrap | 

|-
! 
| Tom Lantos
|  | Democratic
| 1980
| Incumbent re-elected.
| nowrap | 

|-
! 
| Pete Stark
|  | Democratic
| 1972
| Incumbent re-elected.
| nowrap | 

|-
! 
| Tom Campbell
|  | Republican
| 1988
|  | Retired to run for U.S. senator.New member elected.Democratic gain.
| nowrap | 

|-
! 
| Norman Mineta
|  | Democratic
| 1974
| Incumbent re-elected.
| nowrap | 

|-
! 
| Don Edwards
|  | Democratic
| 1972
| Incumbent re-elected.
| nowrap | 

|-
! 
| Leon Panetta
|  | Democratic
| 1976
| Incumbent re-elected.
| nowrap | 

|-
! 
| Gary Condit
|  | Democratic
| 1989 
| Incumbent re-elected.
| nowrap | 

|-
! 
| Richard H. Lehman
|  | Democratic
| 1982
| Incumbent re-elected.
| nowrap | 

|-
! 
| Cal Dooley
|  | Democratic
| 1990
| Incumbent re-elected.
| nowrap | 

|-
! 
| Bill Thomas
|  | Republican
| 1978
| Incumbent re-elected.
| nowrap | 

|-
! 
| Robert J. Lagomarsino
|  | Republican
| 1974
|  | Incumbent lost renomination.New member elected.Republican hold.
| nowrap | 

|-
! 
| Elton Gallegly
|  | Republican
| 1986
| Incumbent re-elected.
| nowrap | 

|-
! 
| Anthony Beilenson
|  | Democratic
| 1976
| Incumbent re-elected.
| nowrap | 

|-
! 
| colspan=3 | None (District created)
|  | New seat.New member elected.Republican gain.
| nowrap | 

|-
! 
| Howard Berman
|  | Democratic
| 1982
| Incumbent re-elected.
| nowrap | 

|-
! 
| Carlos Moorhead
|  | Republican
| 1972
| Incumbent re-elected.
| nowrap | 

|-
! 
| David Dreier
|  | Republican
| 1980
| Incumbent re-elected.
| nowrap | 

|-
! 
| Henry Waxman
|  | Democratic
| 1974
| Incumbent re-elected.
| nowrap | 

|-
! 
| Edward R. Roybal
|  | Democratic
| 1962
|  | Incumbent retired.New member elected.Democratic hold.
| nowrap | 

|-
! 
| Matthew G. Martínez
|  | Democratic
| 1982
| Incumbent re-elected.
| nowrap | 

|-
! 
| Julian Dixon
|  | Democratic
| 1978
| Incumbent re-elected.
| nowrap | 

|-
! 
| colspan=3 | None (District created)
|  | New seat.New member elected.Democratic gain.
| nowrap | 

|-
! 
| Esteban Edward Torres
|  | Democratic
| 1982
| Incumbent re-elected.
| nowrap | 

|-
! 
| Maxine Waters
|  | Democratic
| 1990
| Incumbent re-elected.
| nowrap | 

|-
! 
| Mel Levine
|  | Democratic
| 1982
|  | Retired to run for U.S. senator.New member elected.Democratic hold.
| nowrap | 

|-
! 
| Mervyn Dymally
|  | Democratic
| 1982
|  | Incumbent retired.New member elected.Democratic hold.
| nowrap | 

|-
! 
| Glenn M. Anderson
|  | Democratic
| 1968
|  | Incumbent retired.New member elected.Republican gain.
| nowrap | 

|-
! 
| William E. Dannemeyer
|  | Republican
| 1978
|  | Retired to run for U.S. senator.New member elected.Republican hold.
| nowrap | 

|-
! 
| Jerry Lewis
|  | Republican
| 1978
| Incumbent re-elected.
| nowrap | 

|-
! 
| colspan=3 | None (District created)
|  | New seat.New member elected.Republican gain.
| nowrap | 

|-
! 
| George Brown Jr.
|  | Democratic
| 19621970 1972
| Incumbent re-elected.
| nowrap | 

|-
! 
| colspan=3 | None (District created)
|  | New seat.New member elected.Republican gain.
| nowrap | 

|-
! 
| Al McCandless
|  | Republican
| 1984
| Incumbent re-elected.
| nowrap | 

|-
! 
| Dana Rohrabacher
|  | Republican
| 1988
| Incumbent re-elected.
| nowrap | 

|-
! 
| Bob Dornan
|  | Republican
| 19761982 1984
| Incumbent re-elected.
| nowrap | 

|-
! 
| Christopher Cox
|  | Republican
| 1988
| Incumbent re-elected.
| nowrap | 

|-
! 
| Ron Packard
|  | Republican
| 1982
| Incumbent re-elected.
| nowrap | 

|-
! 
| colspan=3 | None (District created)
|  | New seat.New member elected.Democratic gain.
| nowrap | 

|-
! 
| colspan=3 | None (District created)
|  | New seat.New member elected.Democratic gain.
| nowrap | 

|-
! rowspan=2 | 
| Duke Cunningham
|  | Republican
| 1990
| rowspan=2 | Incumbent retired. Incumbent re-elected.
| rowspan=2 nowrap | 

|-
| Bill Lowery
|  | Republican
| 1980

|-
! 
| Duncan L. Hunter
|  | Republican
| 1980
| Incumbent re-elected.
| nowrap | 

|}

Colorado 

|-
! 
| Pat Schroeder
|  | Democratic
| 1972
| Incumbent re-elected.
| nowrap | 

|-
! 
| David Skaggs
|  | Democratic
| 1986
| Incumbent re-elected.
| nowrap | 

|-
! 
| Ben Nighthorse Campbell
|  | Democratic
| 1986
|  | Retired to run for U.S. senator.New member elected.Republican gain.
| nowrap | 

|-
! 
| Wayne Allard
|  | Republican
| 1990
| Incumbent re-elected.
| nowrap | 

|-
! 
| Joel Hefley
|  | Republican
| 1986
| Incumbent re-elected.
| nowrap | 

|-
! 
| Daniel Schaefer
|  | Republican
| 1983 
| Incumbent re-elected.
| nowrap | 

|}

Connecticut 

|-
! 
| Barbara B. Kennelly
|  | Democratic
| 1982
| Incumbent re-elected.
| nowrap | 

|-
! 
| Sam Gejdenson
|  | Democratic
| 1980
| Incumbent re-elected.
| nowrap | 

|-
! 
| Rosa DeLauro
|  | Democratic
| 1990
| Incumbent re-elected.
| nowrap | 

|-
! 
| Chris Shays
|  | Republican
| 1987 
| Incumbent re-elected.
| nowrap | 

|-
! 
| Gary Franks
|  | Republican
| 1990
| Incumbent re-elected.
| nowrap | 

|-
! 
| Nancy Johnson
|  | Republican
| 1982
| Incumbent re-elected.
| nowrap | 

|}

Delaware 

|-
! 
| Tom Carper
|  | Democratic
| 1982
|  | Retired to run for Governor.New member elected.Republican gain.
| nowrap | 

|}

Florida 

Four seats were added by reapportionment.

|-
! 
| Earl Hutto
|  | Democratic
| 1978
| Incumbent re-elected.
| nowrap | 

|-
! 
| Pete Peterson
|  | Democratic
| 1990
| Incumbent re-elected.
| nowrap | 

|-
! 
| colspan=3 | None (District created)
|  | New seat.New member elected.Democratic gain.
| nowrap | 

|-
! rowspan=2 | 
| Craig James
|  | Republican
| 1988
|  | Incumbent retired.New member elected.Republican hold.
| rowspan=2 nowrap | 

|-
| Charles E. Bennett
|  | Democratic
| 1948
|  | Incumbent retired.New member elected.Democratic loss.

|-
! 
| colspan=3 | None (District created)
|  | New seat.New member elected.Democratic gain.
| nowrap | 

|-
! 
| Cliff Stearns
|  | Republican
| 1988
| Incumbent re-elected.
| nowrap | 

|-
! 
| colspan=3 | None (District created)
|  | New seat.New member elected.Republican gain.
| nowrap | 

|-
! 
| Bill McCollum
|  | Republican
| 1980
| Incumbent re-elected.
| nowrap | 

|-
! 
| Michael Bilirakis
|  | Republican
| 1982
| Incumbent re-elected.
| nowrap | 

|-
! 
| Bill Young
|  | Republican
| 1970
| Incumbent re-elected.
| nowrap | 

|-
! 
| Sam Gibbons
|  | Democratic
| 1962
| Incumbent re-elected.
| nowrap | 

|-
! 
| Andy Ireland
|  | Republican
| 1976
|  | Incumbent retired.New member elected.Republican hold.
| nowrap | 

|-
! 
| colspan=3 | None (District created)
|  | New seat.New member elected.Republican gain.
| nowrap | 

|-
! 
| Porter Goss
|  | Republican
| 1988
| Incumbent re-elected.
| nowrap | 

|-
! 
| Jim Bacchus
|  | Democratic
| 1990
| Incumbent re-elected.
| nowrap | 

|-
! 
| Tom Lewis
|  | Republican
| 1982
| Incumbent re-elected.
| nowrap | 

|-
! 
| William Lehman
|  | Democratic
| 1972
|  | Incumbent retired.New member elected.Democratic hold.
| nowrap | 

|-
! 
| Ileana Ros-Lehtinen
|  | Republican
| 1989
| Incumbent re-elected.
| nowrap | 

|-
! 
| Harry Johnston
|  | Democratic
| 1988
| Incumbent re-elected.
| nowrap | 

|-
! 
| Dante Fascell
|  | Democratic
| 1954
|  | Incumbent retired.New member elected.Democratic hold.
| nowrap | 

|-
! 
| colspan=3 | None (District created)
|  | New seat.New member elected.Republican gain.
| nowrap | 

|-
! rowspan=2 | 
| Clay Shaw
|  | Republican
| 1980
| Incumbent re-elected.
| rowspan=2 nowrap | 

|-
| Lawrence J. Smith
|  | Democratic
| 1982
|  | Incumbent retired.Democratic loss.

|-
! 
| colspan=3 | None (District created)
|  | New seat.New member elected.Democratic gain.
| nowrap | 

|}

Georgia 

|-
! 
| Lindsay Thomas
|  | Democratic
| 1982
|  | Incumbent retired.New member elected.Republican gain.
| nowrap | 

|-
! 
| Charles Floyd Hatcher
|  | Democratic
| 1980
|  | Incumbent lost renomination.New member elected.Democratic hold.
| nowrap | 

|-
! 
| Richard Ray
|  | Democratic
| 1982
|  | Incumbent lost re-election.New member elected.Republican gain.
| nowrap | 

|-
! 
| colspan=3 | None (District created)
|  | New seat.New member elected.Republican gain.
| nowrap | 

|-
! 
| John Lewis
|  | Democratic
| 1986
| Incumbent re-elected.
| nowrap | 

|-
! 
| Newt Gingrich
|  | Republican
| 1978
| Incumbent re-elected.
| nowrap | 

|-
! 
| George Darden
|  | Democratic
| 1983
| Incumbent re-elected.
| nowrap | 

|-
! 
| J. Roy Rowland
|  | Democratic
| 1982
| Incumbent re-elected.
| nowrap | 

|-
! 
| Ed Jenkins
|  | Democratic
| 1976
|  | Incumbent retired.New member elected.Democratic hold.
| nowrap | 

|-
! rowspan=2 | 
| Doug Barnard Jr.
|  | Democratic
| 1976
|  | Incumbent retired.New member elected.Democratic loss.
| rowspan=2 nowrap | 

|-
| Ben L. Jones
|  | Democratic
| 1988
|  | Incumbent lost renomination.New member elected.Democratic hold.

|-
! 
| colspan=3 | None (District created)
|  | New seat.New member elected.Democratic gain.
| nowrap | 

|}

Hawaii 

|-
! 
| Neil Abercrombie
|  | Democratic
| 1986 1988 1990
| Incumbent re-elected.
| nowrap | 

|-
! 
| Patsy Mink
|  | Democratic
| 19641976 1990 
| Incumbent re-elected.
| nowrap | 

|}

Idaho 

|-
! 
| Larry LaRocco
|  | Democratic
| 1990
| Incumbent re-elected.
| nowrap | 

|-
! 
| Richard H. Stallings
|  | Democratic
| 1984
|  | Retired to run for U.S. senator.New member elected.Republican gain.
| nowrap | 

|}

Illinois 

Illinois lost two seats due to reapportionment.

|-
! 
| Charles Hayes
|  | Democratic
| 1984
|  | Incumbent lost renomination.New member elected. Democratic hold.
| nowrap | 

|-
! 
| Gus Savage
|  | Democratic
| 1980
|  | Incumbent lost renomination.New member elected. Democratic hold.
| nowrap | 

|-
! rowspan=2 | 
| Marty Russo
|  | Democratic
| 1974
|  | Incumbent lost renomination.Democratic loss.
| rowspan=2 nowrap | 

|-
| Bill Lipinski
|  | Democratic
| 1982
| Incumbent re-elected.

|-
! 
| colspan=3 | None (District created)
|  | New seat.New member elected.Democratic gain.
| nowrap | 

|-
! rowspan=2 | 
| Dan Rostenkowski
|  | Democratic
| 1958
| Incumbent re-elected.
| rowspan=2 nowrap | 

|-
| Frank Annunzio
|  | Democratic
| 1964
|  | Incumbent retired.Democratic loss.

|-
! 
| Henry Hyde
|  | Republican
| 1974
| Incumbent re-elected.
| nowrap | 

|-
! 
| Cardiss Collins
|  | Democratic
| 1973 
| Incumbent re-elected.
| nowrap | 

|-
! 
| Phil Crane
|  | Republican
| 1969 
| Incumbent re-elected.
| nowrap | 

|-
! 
| Sidney R. Yates
|  | Democratic
| 19481962 1964
| Incumbent re-elected.
| nowrap | 

|-
! 
| John Porter
|  | Republican
| 1980
| Incumbent re-elected.
| nowrap | 

|-
! 
| George E. Sangmeister
|  | Democratic
| 1988
| Incumbent re-elected.
| nowrap | 

|-
! 
| Jerry Costello
|  | Democratic
| 1988
| Incumbent re-elected.
| nowrap | 

|-
! 
| Harris W. Fawell
|  | Republican
| 1984
| Incumbent re-elected.
| nowrap | 

|-
! 
| Dennis Hastert
|  | Republican
| 1986
| Incumbent re-elected.
| nowrap | 

|-
! 
| Thomas W. Ewing
|  | Republican
| 1991 
| Incumbent re-elected.
| nowrap | 

|-
! 
| John W. Cox Jr.
|  | Democratic
| 1986
| | Incumbent lost re-election.New member elected.Republican gain.
| nowrap | 

|-
! 
| Lane Evans
|  | Democratic
| 1982
| Incumbent re-elected.
| nowrap | 

|-
! 
| Robert H. Michel
|  | Republican
| 1956
| Incumbent re-elected.
| nowrap | 

|-
! rowspan=2 | 
| Terry L. Bruce
|  | Democratic
| 1984
| |Incumbent lost renomination.Democratic loss.
| rowspan=2 nowrap | 

|-
| Glenn Poshard
|  | Democratic
| 1988
| Incumbent re-elected.

|-
! 
| Dick Durbin
|  | Democratic
| 1982
| Incumbent re-elected.
| nowrap | 

|}

Indiana 

|-
! 
| Pete Visclosky
|  | Democratic
| 1984
| Incumbent re-elected.
| nowrap | 

|-
! 
| Philip Sharp
|  | Democratic
| 1974
| Incumbent re-elected.
| nowrap | 

|-
! 
| Tim Roemer
|  | Democratic
| 1990
| Incumbent re-elected.
| nowrap | 

|-
! 
| Jill L. Long
|  | Democratic
| 1988
| Incumbent re-elected.
| nowrap | 

|-
! 
| Jim Jontz
|  | Democratic
| 1986
|  | Incumbent lost re-election.New member elected.Republican gain.
| nowrap | 

|-
! 
| Dan Burton
|  | Republican
| 1982
| Incumbent re-elected.
| nowrap | 

|-
! 
| John T. Myers
|  | Republican
| 1966
| Incumbent re-elected.
| nowrap | 

|-
! 
| Frank McCloskey
|  | Democratic
| 1982
| Incumbent re-elected.
| nowrap | 

|-
! 
| Lee H. Hamilton
|  | Democratic
| 1964
| Incumbent re-elected.
| nowrap | 

|-
! 
| Andrew Jacobs Jr.
|  | Democratic
| 19641972 1974
| Incumbent re-elected.
| nowrap | 

|}

Iowa 

One seat was lost due to reapportionment.

|-
! 
| Jim Leach
|  | Republican
| 1976
| Incumbent re-elected.
| nowrap | 

|-
! rowspan=2 | 
| Jim Nussle
|  | Republican
| 1990
| Incumbent re-elected.
| rowspan=2 | 

|-
| David R. Nagle
|  | Democratic
| 1986
|  | Incumbent lost re-election.Democratic loss.

|-
! 
| Jim Ross Lightfoot 
|  | Republican
| 1984
| Incumbent re-elected.
| nowrap | 

|-
! 
| Neal Edward Smith
|  | Democratic
| 1958
| Incumbent re-elected.
| nowrap | 

|-
! 
| Fred Grandy
|  | Republican
| 1986
| Incumbent re-elected.
| nowrap | 

|}

Kansas 

One seat was lost due to reapportionment.

|-
! 
| Pat Roberts
|  | Republican
| 1980
| Incumbent re-elected.
| nowrap | 

|-
! 
| Jim Slattery
|  | Democratic
| 1982
| Incumbent re-elected.
| nowrap | 

|-
! 
| Jan Meyers
|  | Republican
| 1984
| Incumbent re-elected.
| nowrap | 

|-
! rowspan=2 | 
| Dan Glickman
|  | Democratic
| 1976
| Incumbent re-elected.
| rowspan=2 nowrap | 

|-
| Dick Nichols
|  | Republican
| 1990
|  | Incumbent lost renomination.Republican loss.

|}

Kentucky 

|-
! 
| Carroll Hubbard
|  | Democratic
| 1974
|  | Incumbent lost renomination.New member elected.Democratic hold.
| nowrap | 

|-
! 
| William Natcher
|  | Democratic
| 1953 
| Incumbent re-elected.
| nowrap | 

|-
! 
| Romano Mazzoli
|  | Democratic
| 1970
| Incumbent re-elected.
| nowrap | 

|-
! 
| Jim Bunning
|  | Republican
| 1986
| Incumbent re-elected.
| nowrap | 

|-
! rowspan=2 | 
| Hal Rogers
|  | Republican
| 1980
| Incumbent re-elected.
| rowspan=2 nowrap | 

|-
| Chris Perkins
|  | Democratic
| 1984
|  | Incumbent retired.Democratic loss.

|-
! 
| Larry J. Hopkins
|  | Republican
| 1978
|  | Incumbent retired.New member elected.Democratic gain.
| nowrap | 

|}

Louisiana 

One seat lost to reapportionment. Four Incumbents were squeezed into two districts and one new district was created.

|-
! 
| Bob Livingston
|  | Republican
| 1977 
| Incumbent re-elected.
| nowrap | 

|-
! 
| William J. Jefferson
|  | Democratic
| 1990
| Incumbent re-elected.
| nowrap | 

|-
! 
| Billy Tauzin
|  | Democratic
| 1980
| Incumbent re-elected.
| nowrap | 

|-
! 
| colspan=3 | None (District created)
|  | New seat.New member elected.Democratic gain.
| nowrap | 

|-
! rowspan=2 | 
| Jim McCrery
|  | Republican
| 1988
| Incumbent re-elected.
| rowspan=2 nowrap | 

|-
| Jerry Huckaby
|  | Democratic
| 1976
|  | Incumbent lost reelection.Democratic loss.

|-
! rowspan=2 | 
| Richard Baker
|  | Republican
| 1986
| Incumbent re-elected.
| rowspan=2 nowrap | 

|-
| Clyde C. Holloway
|  | Republican
| 1986
|  | Incumbent lost reelection.Republican loss.

|-
! 
| Jimmy Hayes
|  | Democratic
| 1986
| Incumbent re-elected.
| nowrap | 

|}

Maine 

|-
! 
| Thomas Andrews
|  | Democratic
| 1990
| Incumbent re-elected.
| nowrap | 

|-
! 
| Olympia Snowe
|  | Republican
| 1978
| Incumbent re-elected.
| nowrap | 

|}

Maryland 

|-
! rowspan=2 | 
| Wayne Gilchrest
|  | Republican
| 1990
| Incumbent re-elected.
| rowspan=2 nowrap | 

|-
| Tom McMillen
|  | Democratic
| 1986
|  | Incumbent lost reelection.Democratic loss.

|-
! 
| Helen Delich Bentley
|  | Republican
| 1984
| Incumbent re-elected.
| nowrap | 

|-
! 
| Ben Cardin
|  | Democratic
| 1986
| Incumbent re-elected.
| nowrap | 

|-
! 
| colspan=3 | None (District created)
|  | New seat.New member elected.Democratic gain.
| nowrap | 

|-
! 
| Steny Hoyer
|  | Democratic
| 1981
| Incumbent re-elected.
| nowrap | 

|-
! 
| Beverly Byron
|  | Democratic
| 1978
|  | Incumbent lost renomination.New member elected.Republican gain.
| nowrap | 

|-
! 
| Kweisi Mfume
|  | Democratic
| 1986
| Incumbent re-elected.
| nowrap | 

|-
! 
| Connie Morella
|  | Republican
| 1986
| Incumbent re-elected.
| nowrap | 

|}

Massachusetts 

Massachusetts lost one seat due to reapportionment.

|-
! 
| John Olver
|  | Democratic
| June 18, 1991(Special)
| Incumbent re-elected.
| nowrap | 

|-
! 
| Richard Neal
|  | Democratic
| 1988
| Incumbent re-elected.
| nowrap | 

|-
! 
| Joseph D. Early
|  | Democratic
| 1974
|  | Incumbent lost re-election.New member elected.Republican gain.
| nowrap | 

|-
! 
| Barney Frank
|  | Democratic
| 1980
| Incumbent re-elected.
| nowrap | 

|-
! 
| Chester G. Atkins
|  | Democratic
| 1984
|  | Incumbent lost renomination.New member elected.Democratic hold.
| nowrap | 

|-
! 
| Nicholas Mavroules
|  | Democratic
| 1978
|  | Incumbent lost re-election.New member elected.Republican gain.
| nowrap | 

|-
! 
| Ed Markey
|  | Democratic
| 1976
| Incumbent re-elected.
| nowrap | 

|-
! 
| Joseph P. Kennedy II
|  | Democratic
| 1986
| Incumbent re-elected.
| nowrap | 

|-
! rowspan=2 | 
| Joe Moakley
|  | Democratic
| 1972
| Incumbent re-elected.
| rowspan=2|Joe Moakley (Democratic) 69.2% Martin D. Conboy (Republican) 21.4% Lawrence C. Mackin (Independent) 6.2% Robert W. Horan (Independent) 3.2%

|-
| Brian J. Donnelly
|  | Democratic
| 1978
|  | Incumbent retired.Democratic loss.

|-
! 
| Gerry Studds
|  | Democratic
| 1972
| Incumbent re-elected.
| nowrap | 

|}

Michigan 

Michigan lost two seats to reapportionment.

|-
! 
| Robert William Davis
|  | Republican
| 1978
|  | Incumbent retired.New member elected.Democratic gain.
| nowrap | 

|-
! 
| Guy Vander Jagt
|  | Republican
| 1966
|  | Incumbent lost renomination.New member elected.Republican hold.
| nowrap | 

|-
! 
| Paul B. Henry
|  | Republican
| 1984
| Incumbent re-elected.
| nowrap | 

|-
! 
| David Lee Camp
|  | Republican
| 1990
| Incumbent re-elected.
| nowrap | 

|-
! 
| J. Bob Traxler
|  | Democratic
| 1974
|  | Incumbent retired.New member elected.Democratic hold.
| nowrap | 

|-
! 
| Fred Upton
|  | Republican
| 1986
| Incumbent re-elected.
| nowrap | 

|-
! 
| Carl Pursell
|  | Republican
| 1976
|  | Incumbent retired.New member elected.Republican hold.
| nowrap | 

|-
! rowspan=2 | 
| Milton Robert Carr
|  | Democratic
| 19741980 1982
| Incumbent re-elected.
| rowspan=2 nowrap | 

|-
| Howard Wolpe
|  | Democratic
| 1978
|  | Incumbent retired.Democratic loss.

|-
! 
| Dale E. Kildee
|  | Democratic
| 1976
| Incumbent re-elected.
| nowrap | 

|-
! 
| David Bonior
|  | Democratic
| 1976
| Incumbent re-elected.
| nowrap | 

|-
! 
| William Broomfield
|  | Republican
| 1956
|  | Incumbent retired.New member elected.Republican hold.
| nowrap | 

|-
! rowspan=2 | 
| Sander Levin
|  | Democratic
| 1982
| Incumbent re-elected.
| rowspan=2 |Sander Levin (Democratic) 52.6%John Pappageorge (Republican) 45.7%Charles Hahn (Libertarian) 1.1%R.W. Montgomery (Natural Law) 0.8%

|-
| Dennis Hertel
|  | Democratic
| 1980
|  | Incumbent retired.Democratic loss.

|-
! 
| William D. Ford
|  | Democratic
| 1964
| Incumbent re-elected.
| nowrap | 

|-
! 
| John Conyers Jr.
|  | Democratic
| 1964
| Incumbent re-elected.
| nowrap | 

|-
! 
| Barbara-Rose Collins
|  | Democratic
| 1990
| Incumbent re-elected.
| nowrap | 

|-
! 
| John D. Dingell Jr.
|  | Democratic
| 1955 
| Incumbent re-elected.
| nowrap | 

|}

Minnesota 

|-
! 
| Tim Penny
|  | Democratic
| 1982
| Incumbent re-elected.
| nowrap | 

|-
! 
| Vin Weber
|  | Republican
| 1980
|  | Incumbent retired.New member elected.Democratic gain.
| nowrap | 

|-
! 
| Jim Ramstad
|  | Republican
| 1990
| Incumbent re-elected.
| nowrap | 

|-
! 
| Bruce Vento
|  | Democratic
| 1976
| Incumbent re-elected.
| nowrap | 

|-
! 
| Martin Olav Sabo
|  | Democratic
| 1978
| Incumbent re-elected.
| nowrap | 

|-
! 
| Gerry Sikorski
|  | Democratic
| 1982
|  | Incumbent lost re-election.New member elected.Republican gain.
| nowrap | 

|-
! 
| Collin Peterson
|  | Democratic
| 1990
| Incumbent re-elected.
| nowrap | 

|-
! 
| Jim Oberstar
|  | Democratic
| 1974
| Incumbent re-elected.
| nowrap | 

|}

Mississippi 

|-
! 
| Jamie Whitten
|  | Democratic
| 1941
| Incumbent re-elected.
| nowrap | 

|-
! 
| Mike Espy
|  | Democratic
| 1986
| Incumbent re-elected.
| nowrap | 

|-
! 
| Sonny Montgomery
|  | Democratic
| 1966
| Incumbent re-elected.
| nowrap | 

|-
! 
| Michael Parker
|  | Democratic
| 1988
| Incumbent re-elected.
| nowrap | 

|-
! 
| Gene Taylor
|  | Democratic
| 1989
| Incumbent re-elected.
| nowrap | 

|}

Missouri 

|-
! 
| Bill Clay
|  | Democratic
| 1968
| Incumbent re-elected.
| nowrap | 

|-
! 
| Joan Kelly Horn
|  | Democratic
| 1990
|  | Incumbent lost re-election.New member elected.Republican gain.
| nowrap | 

|-
! 
| Dick Gephardt
|  | Democratic
| 1976
| Incumbent re-elected.
| nowrap | 

|-
! 
| Ike Skelton
|  | Democratic
| 1976
| Incumbent re-elected.
| nowrap | 

|-
! 
| Alan Wheat
|  | Democratic
| 1982
| Incumbent re-elected.
| nowrap | 

|-
! 
| Tom Coleman
|  | Republican
| 1976
|  | Incumbent lost re-election.New member elected.Democratic gain.
| nowrap | 

|-
! 
| Mel Hancock
|  | Republican
| 1988
| Incumbent re-elected.
| nowrap | 

|-
! 
| Bill Emerson
|  | Republican
| 1982
| Incumbent re-elected.
| nowrap | 

|-
! 
| Harold Volkmer
|  | Democratic
| 1976
| Incumbent re-elected.
| nowrap | 

|}

Montana 

One seat was lost in reapportionment.

|-
! rowspan=2 | 
| Pat Williams
|  | Democratic
| 1978
| Incumbent re-elected.
| rowspan=2 nowrap | 

|-
| Ron Marlenee
|  | Republican
| 1976
|  | Incumbent lost re-election.Republican loss.

|}

Nebraska 

|-
! 
| Doug Bereuter
|  | Republican
| 1978
| Incumbent re-elected.
| nowrap | 

|-
! 
| Peter Hoagland
|  | Democratic
| 1988
| Incumbent re-elected.
| nowrap | 

|-
! 
| Bill Barrett
|  | Republican
| 1990
| Incumbent re-elected.
| nowrap | 

|}

Nevada 

|-
! 
| James Bilbray
|  | Democratic
| 1986
| Incumbent re-elected.
| nowrap | 

|-
! 
| Barbara Vucanovich
|  | Republican
| 1982
| Incumbent re-elected.
| nowrap | 

|}

New Hampshire 

|-
! 
| Bill Zeliff
|  | Republican
| 1990
| Incumbent re-elected.
| nowrap | 

|-
! 
| Richard Swett
|  | Democratic
| 1990
| Incumbent re-elected.
| nowrap | 

|}

New Jersey 

|-
! 
| Rob Andrews
|  | Democratic
| 1990
| Incumbent re-elected.
| nowrap | 

|-
! 
| William J. Hughes
|  | Democratic
| 1990
| Incumbent re-elected.
| nowrap | 

|-
! 
| Jim Saxton
|  | Republican
| 1984
| Incumbent re-elected.
| nowrap | 

|-
! 
| Chris Smith
|  | Republican
| 1980
| Incumbent re-elected.
| nowrap | 

|-
! 
| Marge Roukema
|  | Republican
| 1980
| Incumbent re-elected.
| nowrap | 

|-
! rowspan=2| 
| Bernard J. Dwyer
|  | Democratic
| 1980
|  | Incumbent retired.Democratic loss.
| rowspan=2 nowrap | 

|-
| Frank Pallone
|  | Democratic
| 1988
| Incumbent re-elected.

|-
! 
| Matthew John Rinaldo
|  | Republican
| 1990
|  | Incumbent retired.New member elected.Republican hold.
| nowrap | 

|-
! 
| Robert A. Roe
|  | Democratic
| 1990
|  | Incumbent retired.New member elected.Democratic hold.
| nowrap | 

|-
! 
| Robert Torricelli
|  | Democratic
| 1982
| Incumbent re-elected.
| nowrap | 

|-
! 
| Donald M. Payne
|  | Democratic
| 1988
| Incumbent re-elected.
| nowrap | 

|-
! 
| Dean Gallo
|  | Republican
| 1984
| Incumbent re-elected.
| nowrap | 

|-
! 
| Dick Zimmer
|  | Republican
| 1990
| Incumbent re-elected.
| nowrap | 

|-
! 
| Frank Joseph Guarini
|  | Democratic
| 1978
|  | Incumbent retired.New member elected.Democratic hold.
| nowrap | 

|}

New Mexico 

|-
! 
| Steven Schiff
|  | Republican
| 1988
| Incumbent re-elected.
| nowrap | 

|-
! 
| Joe Skeen
|  | Republican
| 1980
| Incumbent re-elected.
| nowrap | 

|-
! 
| Bill Richardson
|  | Democratic
| 1982
| Incumbent re-elected.
| nowrap | 

|}

New York 

New York lost three seats in reapportionment.

|-
! 
| George J. Hochbrueckner
|  | Democratic
| 1978
| Incumbent re-elected.
| nowrap | 

|-
! 
| Thomas J. Downey
|  | Democratic
| 1974
|  | Incumbent lost re-election.New member elected.Republican gain.
| nowrap | 

|-
! 
| Norman F. Lent
|  | Republican
| 1970
|  | Incumbent retired.New member elected.Republican hold.
| nowrap | 

|-
! 
| Raymond J. McGrath
|  | Republican
| 1980
|  | Incumbent retired.New member elected.Republican hold.
| nowrap | 

|-
! rowspan=3 | 
| Robert J. Mrazek
|  | Democratic
| 1982
|  | Incumbent retired to run for U.S. senator.Democratic loss.
| rowspan=3 nowrap | 

|-
| Gary Ackerman
|  | Democratic
| 1982
| Incumbent re-elected.

|-
| James H. Scheuer
|  | Democratic
| 19641972 1974
|  | Incumbent retired.Democratic loss.

|-
! 
| Floyd Flake
|  | Democratic
| 1986
| Incumbent re-elected.
| nowrap | 

|-
! 
| Thomas J. Manton
|  | Democratic
| 1984
| Incumbent re-elected.
| nowrap | 

|-
! 
| Theodore S. Weiss
|  | Democratic
| 1976
|  | Incumbent died.New member elected.Democratic hold.
| nowrap | 

|-
! 
| Chuck Schumer
|  | Democratic
| 1980
| Incumbent re-elected.
| nowrap | 

|-
! 
| Edolphus Towns
|  | Democratic
| 1982
| Incumbent re-elected.
| nowrap | 

|-
! 
| Major Owens
|  | Democratic
| 1982
| Incumbent re-elected.
| nowrap | 

|-
! 
| Stephen J. Solarz
|  | Democratic
| 1974
|  | Incumbent lost renomination.New member elected.Democratic hold.
| nowrap | 

|-
! 
| Susan Molinari
|  | Republican
| 1990
| Incumbent re-elected.
| nowrap | 

|-
! 
| Bill Green
|  | Republican
| 1982
|  | Incumbent lost re-election.New member elected.Democratic gain.
| nowrap | 

|-
! 
| Charles B. Rangel
|  | Democratic
| 1970
| Incumbent re-elected.
| nowrap | 

|-
! 
| José E. Serrano
|  | Democratic
| 1990
| Incumbent re-elected.
| nowrap | 

|-
! 
| Eliot Engel
|  | Democratic
| 1988
| Incumbent re-elected.
| nowrap | 

|-
! 
| Nita Lowey
|  | Democratic
| 1988
| Incumbent re-elected.
| nowrap | 

|-
! 
| Hamilton Fish IV
|  | Republican
| 1968
| Incumbent re-elected.
| nowrap | 

|-
! 
| Benjamin A. Gilman
|  | Republican
| 1972
| Incumbent re-elected.
| nowrap | 

|-
! 
| Michael R. McNulty
|  | Democratic
| 1988
| Incumbent re-elected.
| nowrap | 

|-
! 
| Gerald B. H. Solomon
|  | Republican
| 1978
| Incumbent re-elected.
| nowrap | 

|-
! 
| Sherwood Boehlert
|  | Republican
| 1982
| Incumbent re-elected.
| nowrap | 

|-
! 
| David O'Brien Martin
|  | Republican
| 1980
|  | Incumbent retired.New member elected.Republican hold.
| nowrap | 

|-
! 
| James T. Walsh
|  | Republican
| 1988
| Incumbent re-elected.
| nowrap | 

|-
! 
| Matthew F. McHugh
|  | Democratic
| 1974
|  | Incumbent retired.New member elected.Democratic hold.
| nowrap | 

|-
! 
| Bill Paxon
|  | Republican
| 1988
| Incumbent re-elected.
| nowrap | 

|-
! rowspan=2 | 
| Frank Horton
|  | Republican
| 1962
|  | Incumbent retired.Democratic loss.
| rowspan=2 nowrap | 

|-
| Louise Slaughter
|  | Democratic
| 1986
| Incumbent re-elected.

|-
! 
| John J. LaFalce
|  | Democratic
| 1974
| Incumbent re-elected.
| nowrap | 

|-
! 
| Henry J. Nowak
|  | Democratic
| 1974
|  | Incumbent retired.New member elected.Republican gain.
| nowrap | 

|-
! 
| Amo Houghton
|  | Republican
| 1986
| Incumbent re-elected.
| nowrap | 

|}

North Carolina 

|-
! 
| colspan=3 | Vacant
|  | Rep. Walter B. Jones Sr. (D) died September 15, 1992.New member elected.Democratic hold.
| nowrap | 

|-
! 
| Tim Valentine
|  | Democratic
| 1982
| Incumbent re-elected.
| nowrap | 

|-
! 
| Martin Lancaster
|  | Democratic
| 1986
| Incumbent re-elected.
| nowrap | 

|-
! 
| David Price
|  | Democratic
| 1986
| Incumbent re-elected.
| nowrap | 

|-
! 
| Stephen L. Neal
|  | Democratic
| 1974
| Incumbent re-elected.
| nowrap | 

|-
! 
| Howard Coble
|  | Republican
| 1984
| Incumbent re-elected.
| nowrap | 

|-
! 
| Charlie Rose
|  | Democratic
| 1972
| Incumbent re-elected.
| nowrap | 

|-
! 
| Bill Hefner
|  | Democratic
| 1974
| Incumbent re-elected.
| nowrap | 

|-
! 
| Alex McMillan
|  | Republican
| 1984
| Incumbent re-elected.
| nowrap | 

|-
! 
| Cass Ballenger
|  | Republican
| 1986
| Incumbent re-elected.
| nowrap | 

|-
! 
| Charles H. Taylor
|  | Republican
| 1990
| Incumbent re-elected.
| nowrap | 

|-
! 
| colspan=3 | New seat
|  | New seat.New member elected.Democratic gain.
| nowrap | 

|}

North Dakota 

|-
! 
| Byron Dorgan
|  | Democratic
| 1980
|  | Retired to run for U.S. senator.New member elected.Democratic hold.
| nowrap | 

|}

Ohio 

|-
! 
| Charlie Luken
|  | Democratic
| 1990
|  | Incumbent retired.New member elected.Democratic hold.
| nowrap | 

|-
! 
| Bill Gradison
|  | Republican
| 1974
| Incumbent re-elected.
| nowrap | 

|-
! 
| Tony P. Hall
|  | Democratic
| 1978
| Incumbent re-elected.
| nowrap | 

|-
! 
| Mike Oxley
|  | Republican
| 1981
| Incumbent re-elected.
| nowrap | 

|-
! 
| Paul Gillmor
|  | Republican
| 1988
| Incumbent re-elected.
| nowrap | 

|-
! rowspan=2 | 
| Bob McEwen
|  | Republican
| 1980
|  | Incumbent lost re-election.New member elected.Democratic gain.
| rowspan=2 nowrap | 

|-
| Clarence E. Miller
|  | Republican
| 1966
|  | Incumbent lost renomination.Republican Loss

|-
! 
| Dave Hobson
|  | Republican
| 1990
| Incumbent re-elected.
| nowrap | 

|-
! 
| John Boehner
|  | Republican
| 1990
| Incumbent re-elected.
| nowrap | 

|-
! 
| Marcy Kaptur
|  | Democratic
| 1982
| Incumbent re-elected.
| nowrap | 

|-
! 
| Mary Rose Oakar
|  | Democratic
| 1976
|  | Incumbent lost re-election.New member elected.Republican gain.
| nowrap | 

|-
! 
| Louis Stokes
|  | Democratic
| 1968
| Incumbent re-elected.
| nowrap | 

|-
! 
| John Kasich
|  | Republican
| 1982
| Incumbent re-elected.
| nowrap | 

|-
! rowspan=2 | 
| Donald J. Pease
|  | Democratic
| 1976
|  | Incumbent retired.New member elected.Democratic hold.
| rowspan=2 | 

|-
| Dennis E. Eckart
|  | Democratic
| 1980
|  | Incumbent retired.Democratic loss.

|-
! 
| Thomas C. Sawyer
|  | Democratic
| 1986
| Incumbent re-elected.
| nowrap | 

|-
! 
| Chalmers Wylie
|  | Republican
| 1966
|  | Incumbent retired.New member elected.Republican hold.
| nowrap | 

|-
! 
| Ralph Regula
|  | Republican
| 1972
| Incumbent re-elected.
| nowrap | 

|-
! 
| James Traficant
|  | Democratic
| 1984
| Incumbent re-elected.
| nowrap | 

|-
! 
| Douglas Applegate
|  | Democratic
| 1976
| Incumbent re-elected.
| nowrap | 

|-
! 
| Ed Feighan
|  | Democratic
| 1982
|  | Incumbent retired.New member elected.Democratic hold.
| nowrap | 

|}

Oklahoma 

|-
! 
| Jim Inhofe
|  | Republican
| 1986
| Incumbent re-elected.
| nowrap | 

|-
! 
| Mike Synar
|  | Democratic
| 1978
| Incumbent re-elected.
| nowrap | 

|-
! 
| William K. Brewster
|  | Democratic
| 1990
| Incumbent re-elected.
| nowrap | 

|-
! 
| Dave McCurdy
|  | Democratic
| 1980
| Incumbent re-elected.
| nowrap | 

|-
! 
| Mickey Edwards
|  | Republican
| 1976
|  | Incumbent lost renomination.New member elected.Republican hold.
| nowrap | 

|-
! 
| Glenn English
|  | Democratic
| 1974
| Incumbent re-elected.
| nowrap | 

|}

Oregon 

|-
! 
| Les AuCoin
|  | Democratic
| 1974
|  | Retired to run for U.S. senator.New member elected.Democratic hold.
| nowrap | 

|-
! 
| Robert Freeman Smith
|  | Republican
| 1982
| Incumbent re-elected.
| nowrap | 

|-
! 
| Ron Wyden
|  | Democratic
| 1980
| Incumbent re-elected.
| nowrap | 

|-
! 
| Peter DeFazio
|  | Democratic
| 1986
| Incumbent re-elected.
| nowrap | 

|-
! 
| Michael J. Kopetski
|  | Democratic
| 1990
| Incumbent re-elected.
| nowrap | 

|}

Pennsylvania 

|-
! 
| Thomas M. Foglietta
|  | Democratic
| 1980
| Incumbent re-elected.
| nowrap | 

|-
! 
| Lucien Blackwell
|  | Democratic
| 1991
| Incumbent re-elected.
| nowrap | 

|-
! 
| Robert A. Borski Jr.
|  | Democratic
| 1982
| Incumbent re-elected.
| nowrap | 

|-
! 
| Joseph P. Kolter
|  | Democratic
| 1982
|  | Incumbent lost renomination.New member elected.Democratic hold.
| nowrap | 

|-
! 
| William F. Clinger Jr.
|  | Republican
| 1978
|  | Incumbent re-elected.Republican hold.
| nowrap | 

|-
! 
| Gus Yatron
|  | Democratic
| 1968
|  | Incumbent retired.New member elected.Democratic hold.
| nowrap | 

|-
! rowspan=2 | 
| Curt Weldon
|  | Republican
| 1986
| Incumbent re-elected.
| rowspan=2 nowrap | 

|-
| Richard T. Schulze
|  | Republican
| 1974
|  | Incumbent retired.Republican Loss

|-
! 
| Peter H. Kostmayer
|  | Democratic
| 19761980 1982
|  | Incumbent lost re-election.New member elected.Republican gain.
| nowrap | 

|-
! 
| Bud Shuster
|  | Republican
| 1972
| Incumbent re-elected.
| nowrap | 

|-
! 
| Joseph M. McDade
|  | Republican
| 1962
| Incumbent re-elected.
| nowrap | 

|-
! 
| Paul Kanjorski
|  | Democratic
| 1984
| Incumbent re-elected.
| nowrap | 

|-
! 
| John Murtha
|  | Democratic
| 1974
| Incumbent re-elected.
| nowrap | 

|-
! 
| Lawrence Coughlin
|  | Republican
| 1968
|  | Incumbent retired.New member elected.Democratic gain.
| nowrap | 

|-
! 
| William J. Coyne
|  | Democratic
| 1980
| Incumbent re-elected.
| nowrap | 

|-
! 
| Donald L. Ritter
|  | Republican
| 1978
|  | Incumbent lost re-election.New member elected.Democratic gain.
| nowrap | 

|-
! 
| Robert Smith Walker
|  | Republican
| 1976
| Incumbent re-elected.
| nowrap | 

|-
! 
| George Gekas
|  | Republican
| 1982
| Incumbent re-elected.
| nowrap | 

|-
! 
| Rick Santorum
|  | Republican
| 1990
| Incumbent re-elected.
| nowrap | 

|-
! 
| William F. Goodling
|  | Republican
| 1974
| Incumbent re-elected.
| nowrap | 

|-
! rowspan=2 | 
| Joseph M. Gaydos
|  | Democratic
| 1968
|  | Incumbent retired.Democratic loss.
| rowspan=2 nowrap | 

|-
| Austin Murphy
|  | Democratic
| 1976
| Incumbent re-elected.

|-
! 
| Tom Ridge
|  | Republican
| 1982
| Incumbent re-elected.
| nowrap | 

|}

Rhode Island 

|-
! 
| Ronald Machtley
|  | Republican
| 1988
| Incumbent re-elected.
| nowrap | 

|-
! 
| Jack Reed
|  | Democratic
| 1990
| Incumbent re-elected.
| nowrap | 

|}

South Carolina 

|-
! 
| Arthur Ravenel Jr.
|  | Republican
| 1986
| Incumbent re-elected.
| nowrap | 

|-
! 
| Floyd Spence
|  | Republican
| 1970
| Incumbent re-elected.
| nowrap | 

|-
! 
| Butler Derrick
|  | Democratic
| 1974
| Incumbent re-elected.
| nowrap | 

|-
! 
| Liz J. Patterson
|  | Democratic
| 1986
|  | Incumbent lost re-election.New member elected.Republican gain.
| nowrap | 

|-
! 
| John Spratt
|  | Democratic
| 1982
| Incumbent re-elected.
| nowrap | 

|-
! 
| Robin Tallon
|  | Democratic
| 1982
|  | Incumbent retired.New member elected.Democratic hold.
| nowrap | 

|}

South Dakota 

|-
! 
| Tim Johnson
|  | Democratic
| 1986
| Incumbent re-elected.
| nowrap | 

|}

Tennessee 

|-
! 
| Jimmy Quillen
|  | Republican
| 1962
| Incumbent re-elected.
| nowrap | 

|-
! 
| Jimmy Duncan
|  | Republican
| 1988
| Incumbent re-elected.
| nowrap | 

|-
! 
| Marilyn Lloyd
|  | Democratic
| 1974
| Incumbent re-elected.
| nowrap | 

|-
! 
| Jim Cooper
|  | Democratic
| 1982
| Incumbent re-elected.
| nowrap | 

|-
! 
| Bob Clement
|  | Democratic
| 1988
| Incumbent re-elected.
| nowrap | 

|-
! 
| Bart Gordon
|  | Democratic
| 1984
| Incumbent re-elected.
| nowrap | 

|-
! 
| Don Sundquist
|  | Republican
| 1982
| Incumbent re-elected.
| nowrap | 

|-
! 
| John S. Tanner
|  | Democratic
| 1988
| Incumbent re-elected.
| nowrap | 

|-
! 
| Harold Ford Sr.
|  | Democratic
| 1982
| Incumbent re-elected.
| nowrap | 

|}

Texas 

|-
! 
| Jim Chapman
|  | Democratic
| 1985
| Incumbent re-elected.
| nowrap | 

|-
! 
| Charles Wilson
|  | Democratic
| 1972
| Incumbent re-elected.
| nowrap | 

|-
! 
| Sam Johnson
|  | Republican
| 1991
| Incumbent re-elected.
| nowrap | 

|-
! 
| Ralph Hall
|  | Democratic
| 1980
| Incumbent re-elected.
| nowrap | 

|-
! 
| John Wiley Bryant
|  | Democratic
| 1982
| Incumbent re-elected.
| nowrap | 

|-
! 
| Joe Barton
|  | Republican
| 1984
| Incumbent re-elected.
| nowrap | 

|-
! 
| Bill Archer
|  | Republican
| 1970
| Incumbent re-elected.
| nowrap | 

|-
! 
| Jack Fields
|  | Republican
| 1980
| Incumbent re-elected.
| nowrap | 

|-
! 
| Jack Brooks
|  | Democratic
| 1966
| Incumbent re-elected.
| nowrap | 

|-
! 
| J. J. Pickle
|  | Democratic
| 1963
| Incumbent re-elected.
| nowrap | 

|-
! 
| Chet Edwards
|  | Democratic
| 1990
| Incumbent re-elected.
| nowrap | 

|-
! 
| Pete Geren
|  | Democratic
| 1989
| Incumbent re-elected.
| nowrap | 

|-
! 
| Bill Sarpalius
|  | Democratic
| 1988
| Incumbent re-elected.
| nowrap | 

|-
! 
| Greg Laughlin
|  | Democratic
| 1988
| Incumbent re-elected.
| nowrap | 

|-
! 
| Kika de la Garza
|  | Democratic
| 1964
| Incumbent re-elected.
| nowrap | 

|-
! 
| Ronald D. Coleman
|  | Democratic
| 1982
| Incumbent re-elected.
| nowrap | 

|-
! 
| Charles Stenholm
|  | Democratic
| 1978
| Incumbent re-elected.
| nowrap | 

|-
! 
| Craig Washington
|  | Democratic
| 1989
| Incumbent re-elected.
| nowrap | 

|-
! 
| Larry Combest
|  | Republican
| 1984
| Incumbent re-elected.
| nowrap | 

|-
! 
| Henry B. González
|  | Democratic
| 1961
| Incumbent re-elected.
| nowrap | 

|-
! 
| Lamar S. Smith
|  | Republican
| 1986
| Incumbent re-elected.
| nowrap | 

|-
! 
| Tom DeLay
|  | Republican
| 1984
| Incumbent re-elected.
| nowrap | 

|-
! 
| Albert Bustamante
|  | Democratic
| 1984
|  | Incumbent lost re-election.New member elected.Republican gain.
| nowrap | 

|-
! 
| Martin Frost
|  | Democratic
| 1978
| Incumbent re-elected.
| nowrap | 

|-
! 
| Michael A. Andrews
|  | Democratic
| 1982
| Incumbent re-elected.
| nowrap | 

|-
! 
| Dick Armey
|  | Republican
| 1984
| Incumbent re-elected.
| nowrap | 

|-
! 
| Solomon P. Ortiz
|  | Democratic
| 1982
| Incumbent re-elected.
| nowrap | 

|-
! 
| colspan=3 | None (District created)
|  | New seat.New member elected.Democratic gain.
| nowrap | 

|-
! 
| colspan=3 | None (District created)
|  | New seat.New member elected.Democratic gain.
| nowrap | 

|-
! 
| colspan=3 | None (District created)
|  | New seat.New member elected.Democratic gain.
| nowrap | 

|}

Utah 

|-
! 
| James V. Hansen
|  | Republican
| 1980
| Incumbent re-elected.
| nowrap | 

|-
! 
| Wayne Owens
|  | Democratic
| 19721974 1986
|  | Retired to run for U.S. senator.New member elected.Democratic hold.
| nowrap | 

|-
! 
| Bill Orton
|  | Democratic
| 1990
| Incumbent re-elected.
| nowrap | 

|}

Vermont 

|-
! 
| Bernie Sanders
|  | Independent
| 1990
| Incumbent re-elected.
| nowrap | 

|}

Virginia 

One seat gained in reapportionment.

|-
! 
| Herbert H. Bateman
|  | Republican
| 1982
| Incumbent re-elected.
| nowrap | 

|-
! 
| Owen B. Pickett
|  | Democratic
| 1986
| Incumbent re-elected.
| nowrap | 

|-
! 
| colspan=3 | None (District created)
|  | New seat.New member elected.Democratic gain.
| nowrap | 

|-
! 
| Norman Sisisky
|  | Democratic
| 1982
| Incumbent re-elected.
| nowrap | 

|-
! 
| Lewis F. Payne Jr.
|  | Democratic
| 1988
| Incumbent re-elected.
| nowrap | 

|-
! 
| Jim Olin
|  | Democratic
| 1982
|  | Incumbent retired.New member elected.Republican gain.
| nowrap | 

|-
! rowspan=2 | 
| George Allen
|  | Republican
| 1991
|  | Retired to run for Governor of Virginia.Republican loss.
| rowspan=2 nowrap | 

|-
| Thomas J. Bliley Jr.
|  | Republican
| 1980
| Incumbent re-elected.

|-
! 
| Jim Moran
|  | Democratic
| 1990
| Incumbent re-elected.
| nowrap | 

|-
! 
| Rick Boucher
|  | Democratic
| 1982
| Incumbent re-elected.
| nowrap | 

|-
! 
| Frank Wolf
|  | Republican
| 1980
| Incumbent re-elected.
| nowrap | 

|-
! 
| colspan=3 | None (District created)
|  | New seat.New member elected.Democratic gain.
| nowrap | 

|}

Washington 

|-
! 
| John Miller
|  | Republican
| 1984
|  | Incumbent retired.New member elected.Democratic gain.
| nowrap | 

|-
! 
| Al Swift
|  | Democratic
| 1978
| Incumbent re-elected.
| nowrap | 

|-
! 
| Jolene Unsoeld
|  | Democratic
| 1988
| Incumbent re-elected.
| nowrap | 

|-
! 
| Sid Morrison
|  | Republican
| 1980
|  | Retired to run for Governor of Washington.New member elected.Democratic gain.
| nowrap | 

|-
! 
| Tom Foley
|  | Democratic
| 1964
| Incumbent re-elected.
| nowrap | 

|-
! 
| Norm Dicks
|  | Democratic
| 1976
| Incumbent re-elected.
| nowrap | 

|-
! 
| Jim McDermott
|  | Democratic
| 1988
| Incumbent re-elected.
| nowrap | 

|-
! 
| Rod Chandler
|  | Republican
| 1982
|  | Retired to run for U.S. senator.New member elected.Republican hold.
| nowrap | 

|-
! 
| colspan=3 | None (District created)
|  | New seat.New member elected.Democratic gain.
| nowrap | 

|}

West Virginia 

|-
! rowspan=2 | 
| Alan Mollohan
|  | Democratic
| 1982
| Incumbent re-elected.
| rowspan=2 nowrap | 

|-
| Harley O. Staggers Jr.
|  | Democratic
| 1982
|  | Incumbent lost renomination.Democratic loss.

|-
! 
| Bob Wise
|  | Democratic
| 1982
| Incumbent re-elected.
| nowrap | 

|-
! 
| Nick Rahall
|  | Democratic
| 1976
| Incumbent re-elected.
| nowrap | 

|}

Wisconsin 

|-
! 
| Les Aspin
|  | Democratic
| 1970
| Incumbent re-elected.
| nowrap | 

|-
! 
| Scott L. Klug
|  | Republican
| 1990
| Incumbent re-elected.
| nowrap | 

|-
! 
| Steve Gunderson
|  | Republican
| 1980
| Incumbent re-elected.
| nowrap | 

|-
! 
| Jerry Kleczka
|  | Democratic
| 1984
| Incumbent re-elected.
| nowrap | 

|-
! 
| Jim Moody
|  | Democratic
| 1982
|  | Retired to run for U.S. senator.New member elected.Democratic hold.
| nowrap | 

|-
! 
| Tom Petri
|  | Republican
| 1979 
| Incumbent re-elected.
| nowrap | 

|-
! 
| Dave Obey
|  | Democratic
| 1969 
| Incumbent re-elected.
| nowrap | 

|-
! 
| Toby Roth
|  | Republican
| 1978
| Incumbent re-elected.
| nowrap | 

|-
! 
| Jim Sensenbrenner
|  | Republican
| 1978
| Incumbent re-elected.
| nowrap | 

|}

Wyoming 

|-
! 
| Craig L. Thomas
|  | Republican
| 1989
| Incumbent re-elected.
| nowrap | 

|}

See also
 1992 United States elections
 1992 United States gubernatorial elections
 1992 United States presidential election
 1992 United States Senate elections
 102nd United States Congress
 103rd United States Congress

Notes

References